The Jerusalem Report is a fortnightly print and online news magazine that covers political, security, economic, religious and cultural issues in Israel, the Middle East and the Jewish world.

Founded as an independent weekly publication in 1990, it now publishes 24 issues a year under the corporate umbrella of The Jerusalem Post Group, but remains editorially independent of The Jerusalem Post.
The magazine features interviews with prominent personalities and in-depth news coverage, features and analyses, viewpoints and commentaries, book reviews and a backpage cartoon.

History
The Jerusalem Report was established in 1990 by South African-born Israeli journalist Hirsh Goodman, who served as its editor-in-chief and publisher for eight years. David Horovitz took over as editor-in-chief from 1998 to 2004, Sharon Ashley from 2004 to 2006, and Eetta Prince-Gibson from 2006 to 2011. They were followed by Matthew Kalman (January to May 2012), Avi Hoffmann (June to November 2012) and Ilan Evyatar (December 2012 to May 2017). Steve Linde, former editor-in-chief of The Jerusalem Post, was appointed editor in June 2017.

In 1996, The Jerusalem Report editors and staff published a biography of assassinated Prime Minister Yitzhak Rabin, titled Shalom, Friend.

In 1999, The Jerusalem Report correspondent Micha Odenheimer won the American Jewish Joint Distribution Committee's Boris Smolar Award for his cover story titled "The Abandoned Jews of Quara," which resulted in the airlift of some 2,000 Jews from Ethiopia to Israel.

In 2000, American journalist Jeffrey Goldberg referred to The Jerusalem Report as "the best periodical published in Israel, in English or Hebrew. The Jerusalem Report is a beacon of professionalism and sobriety in a press culture that sometimes resembles the National Hockey League."

In 2004, The Jerusalem Report won the American Jewish Joint Distribution Committee's Boris Smolar Award for its coverage of the Jewish World.

In April 2018, senior writer Amotz Asa-El's five-part series on the future of the Jewish people won the B'nai B'rith World Center Award for Journalism Recognizing Excellence in Diaspora Reportage. In July 2018, The Jerusalem Report sparked a media furor after it dismissed its longtime illustrator, Avi Katz, over a cartoon portraying then-Israeli Prime Minister Benjamin Netanyahu and lawmakers from his Likud party with pigs' heads, celebrating the passage of the Jewish Nation-State Law in the Knesset, Israel's parliament, under the title, "All animals are equal but some are more equal than others." The cartoon, a reference to George Orwell’s Animal Farm, was deemed offensive by the magazine's management.

Ownership
The Jerusalem Report is owned by The Jerusalem Post Group, a Tel Aviv-based company controlled by Israeli businessman Eli Azur. It purchased The Jerusalem Report from Conrad Black's Hollinger newspaper group in 2004.The Jerusalem Report had been funded initially by five philanthropists, including Charles Bronfman, and was sold in 1998 to Hollinger, which had also purchased The Jerusalem Post.

Jerusalem Report Online
In addition to the print edition, which has an international circulation of some 60,000, The Jerusalem Report is published online at The Jerusalem Report | The Jerusalem Post.

References

External links
 Jerusalem Post
 The Jerusalem Report | The Jerusalem Post

1990 establishments in Israel
Biweekly magazines
English-language magazines
Magazines established in 1990
Mass media in Jerusalem
Political magazines published in Israel
Weekly magazines